"The Man I Love" is a popular standard in AABA form with music by George Gershwin and lyrics by his brother Ira. Part of the 1924 score for the Gershwin musical comedy Lady, Be Good, the song was deleted from that show and put into the Gershwins' 1927 government satire Strike Up the Band (where it appears as "The Man I Love" and "The Girl I Love"), which closed out-of-town. It was considered for, then rejected from, the 1928 Ziegfeld hit Rosalie.

Covers 

Like many songs from George and Ira Gershwin, "The Man I Love" is considered part of the Great American Songbook and was covered on stage and on record by many artists. It was recorded by Kate Bush in 1994 for Larry Adler's The Glory of Gershwin tribute album and released as a single on 18 July 1994, which reached number 27 on the UK Singles Chart.

In 2004, the Brazilian singer-songwriter Caetano Veloso who identifies himself as bisexual recorded a gay version of the song for his English-language album A Foreign Sound.

Further reading
 Philip Furia, Ira Gershwin: The Art of the Lyricist Oxford University Press: Oxford 1996, 
 Ira Gershwin, Lyrics on Several Occasions Limelight Editions: New York City 1973.
 Ted Gioia, The Jazz Standards: A Guide to the Repertoire Oxford University Press: Oxford  2012, 
 Alec Wilder, American Popular Song: The Great Innovators, 1900-1950 Oxford University Press: Oxford 1972,

See also
List of 1920s jazz standards

References

External links
 At Jazz Standards

1920s jazz standards
1924 songs
1928 singles
1994 singles
Bluebird Records singles
Kate Bush songs
Songs with lyrics by Ira Gershwin
Songs with music by George Gershwin